Nava is a municipality in the Autonomous Community of the Principality of Asturias, Spain. It is also the name of one of the parishes in this municipality, as well as the name of the municipal capital.

Nava is bordered on the north by Sariego, Villaviciosa and Cabranes, on the south by Laviana and Piloña, on the east by Piloña, and on the west by Bimenes and Siero.

The Cider Museum, dedicated to the Asturian national drink, is located in the capital.

Parishes
There are six parishes (administrative divisions):
Ceceda
Cuenya 
El Remedio 
Nava
Priandi
Tresali

Politics

References

External links
Federación Asturiana de Concejos 

Municipalities in Asturias